Puodžiai (formerly ) is a village in Kėdainiai district municipality, in Kaunas County, in central Lithuania. According to the 2011 census, the village has a population of 2 people. It is located 2 km from Šlapaberžė.

Demography

References

Villages in Kaunas County
Kėdainiai District Municipality